Church Street Station is a historic train station and commercial development in Orlando, Florida, United States.

Church Street station may also refer to:

Church Street tram stop in London
Church Street station, an MBTA commuter rail station in New Bedford, Massachusetts under construction with anticipated opening 2023
Church Street station, or Church station, a Muni Metro station in San Francisco
Church Street Station, post office at 90 Church Street in New York City

See also
Church Street (disambiguation)
Church station (disambiguation)
Church Road railway station (disambiguation)